Sambo at the Pan American Games was only held at the 1983 Pan American Games in Caracas, Venezuela.

Medal table

Medalists

Men's events

Women's events

References

 
Sambo
Sambo at multi-sport events